Heidi Cortez (born March 11, 1981) is an American entrepreneur, coach, speaker, writer, and advisor. In November 2005, Cortez was hired by Howard Stern to be the radio host and co-writer on a segment on his Sirius XM satellite channel. On the show, Cortez would read bedtime stories to the listeners at the end of the day.

She released her first book Heidi’s Bedtime Stories on November 7, 2006, through Simon & Schuster. The book immediately made the Barnes & Noble's Best Sellers List. In , the book was published again in paperback.

Her acting and modeling career took off internationally in print, including Maxim Magazine, and several TV commercials, and music videos. In 2007–2008, Cortez was cast and appeared on the hit American reality television show Sunset Tan on the E! Network for two seasons, which at the time helped escalate the success of her business, Cabana Tans in Reno, which was one of the largest tanning salons in northern Nevada.

She wrote her second book titled, For Somebody Who Knows Nobody: How to Start Your Modeling Career in 2014 after helping many aspiring models launch their careers.

In 2017, Cortez created www.TheModelAdviser.com, an online community and safe haven for models, aspiring models, children, and their parents through which she does coaching and mentoring.

As 2020 Cortez founded the www.3DollarMarketingClub.com. An online educational source to help entrepreneurs learn their own marketing without having to hire big agencies. 

In 2021 Cortez founded www.PoshBossLA.com. Affordable clothing for female entrepreneurs.

In 2022 Cortez wrote her 4th book, Get Verified And Profit Like A Boss.

References

External links
 
 

1981 births
21st-century American businesspeople
21st-century American businesswomen
American women writers
Participants in American reality television series
Living people